Sunset Park Pavilion, also known as the Sunset Park Shelter House/Pagoda, is a historic park pavilion located at Evansville, Indiana. It was built in 1912, and is a one-story shelter house in the form of a Japanese pagoda.  It is constructed of reinforced concrete and is topped by a red tile roof that is characteristically upturned at the corners. It was originally an open air facility, but has been enclosed.  It was restored in 1993 and now houses the Evansville convention and visitors bureau.

It was added to the National Register of Historic Places in 1992.

References

Park buildings and structures on the National Register of Historic Places in Indiana
Bungalow architecture in Indiana
Buildings and structures completed in 1912
Buildings and structures in Evansville, Indiana
National Register of Historic Places in Evansville, Indiana